Kidnapped is a 1971 British adventure film, directed by Delbert Mann and starring Michael Caine, Trevor Howard, Jack Hawkins and Donald Pleasence, as well as a number of well-known British character actors. The film is based on the 1886 novel Kidnapped and the first half of the 1893 sequel Catriona by Robert Louis Stevenson.

Plot
Young David Balfour arrives at a bleak Scottish house, the House of Shaws, to claim his inheritance. The house and land have been under the custodianship of his father's brother, Ebenezer Balfour, but on reaching adulthood, the land and property become David's. Ebenezer is having none of it, however, so he first tries to murder him, then has him kidnapped by sea captain Hoseason, with whom he has "a venture for trade in the West Indies". David is shipped off to be sold as a slave in the Carolinas. He strikes up a friendship with Alan Breck, escaping from Charles Edward Stuart's defeat at Culloden. Breck is in a coble which is run down in the fog by Hoseason's ship and once aboard, asks Hoseason to take him to France. When Hoseason refuses, Breck offers him 60 guineas to put him down on Loch Linnhe.

On discovering that Breck has a money belt full of Jacobite gold, Hoseason and his crew try to kill Breck, but he is forewarned by David and the two kill half a dozen of the crew before the others retreat. Hoseason offers terms to end the fighting, but the ship runs aground. Only Breck and Balfour appear to survive and they manage to get to land. They set out for Edinburgh, dodging the ruthless Redcoats. Numerous adventures follow as they meet up with Breck's family, friends and foes alike. These include Breck's cousin, James Stewart, and his daughter Catriona, with whom David falls in love. Breck hopes to incite another rebellion for Scottish independence but James Stewart and his clan would have none of it. James felt that the Battle of Culloden was terrible and unnecessary. He also reasoned with Breck that the Redcoats could never be defeated in the future as they had better tactics and cannon. Later on, a Scottish Captain of a Redcoat patrol is killed in a skirmish with the Stewart Clan on a farm. Subsequently Breck, David and Catriona quickly flee the scene, but the seriously injured James, being assumed dead, is abandoned and then captured. He gets the blame for the killing and is imprisoned in the Castle. Later on, David and Catriona part with Breck and meet up with a lawyer to defend James. They are allowed to visit James in the Castle. They explain to the lawyer that James Stewart is innocent of the killing although they do not know who killed the Captain. It is pointed out, however, that Dave is risking his life by giving evidence to the fact. They are visited by the Lord Advocate and his daughter who explain to them that a New Scotland is in the making as part of the Union with England, so therefore rebellions by the Highland Clans in the future are not necessary. The Lord Advocate tells them both that he is a highlander too but would wish Alan Breck to be captured and killed. Unbeknownst to the Lord Advocate, Breck, hiding in a large cupboard, was listening in to their conversation in anger and still wished to carry out a future rebellion. Finally Catriona meets Alan out in the Scottish countryside and pleads with him to reconsider rebelling against England, as Scotland is no longer interested in fighting. Alan Breck is then left to himself, viewing the countryside and has memories of the people being killed in the futile Battle of Culloden. He feels guilty for the young men he sent out to their deaths. He finally realizes that a New Scotland does not need him. It turns out that it was he that killed the Captain. The film ends when he decides to hand himself in to the Castle occupied by the Redcoats in order to save James.

Cast

Production
Although the film is loosely based on the book written by Robert Louis Stevenson for which David Balfour is the main character, the film is fact mostly focused on the character of Alan Breck played by Michael Caine. Caine had already risen to acting stardom in over 37 previous films. The film was originally made for television but was screened in cinemas in some countries, as with other adaptations of classics directed by Delbert Mann, including Heidi and David Copperfield. Filming started in May 1971.

Kidnapped was shot almost entirely on location in Scotland. Places include Argyll, Mull, Culross and Stirling Castle. The opening moorland scene of the end of the Battle of Culloden was filmed in Argyll, with Highlander extras provided by Lochaber High School and Redcoat extras by Oban High School. Pinewood Studios was used for some interior scenes.

The film was originally known as David and Catriona.

Music
The soundtrack was composed and conducted by Roy Budd. The end title song, "For All My Days", was sung by Mary Hopkin.

References

External links
 
 
 
 Kidnapped – Photos

1971 films
1970s adventure films
Films based on Kidnapped (novel)
Films directed by Delbert Mann
Films scored by Roy Budd
British adventure films
Films based on multiple works of a series
1970s children's films
Films set in Scotland
Films shot in Argyll and Bute
Films shot at Pinewood Studios
1970s English-language films
1970s British films